Typhaea is a genus of beetles belonging to the family Mycetophagidae.

The genus was described in 1829 by Stephens.

Species:
 Typhaea africana Dajoz, 1970
 Typhaea angusta Rosenhauer, 1856
 Typhaea decipiens Lohse, 1989
 Typhaea hirta Broun, 1880
 Typhaea stercorea (Linnaeus, 1758)

References

Tenebrionoidea